Israel competed at the 1998 Winter Olympics in Nagano, Japan.

The Israeli delegation included 3 figure skaters. Michael Shmerkin competed in the men's event, Galit Chait and Sergei Sakhnovski competed in ice dancing.

Figure skating

References 

Nations at the 1998 Winter Olympics
1998 Winter Olympics
Winter Olympics